This is the progression of world record improvements of the 5000 metres W45 division of Masters athletics.

Key

References

Masters Athletics 5000 m list

Masters athletics world record progressions